Cuphodes lithographa is a moth of the family Gracillariidae. It is known from Queensland, Australia. It was described by Edward Meyrick in 1912.

References

Cuphodes
Moths described in 1912